Thomas Francis Aloysius Carey (October 11, 1906 – February 21, 1970) was a second baseman who played in Major League Baseball between  and . Nicknamed "Scoops" for his defensive ability, Carey batted and threw right-handed.

The native of Hoboken, New Jersey, began his professional baseball career with the Chambersburg Young Yanks of the Blue Ridge League in 1930.  He had a batting average of .306 that year, a personal best. He then was acquired by the St. Louis Cardinals' organization and toiled in their system for five years, including three with the top-level Rochester Red Wings.

His most productive season came in his rookie season with the Browns, when he hit .273 and posted career-highs in runs (58), RBI (57), doubles (27), triples (6) and games played (134). In an eight-season career, Carey was a .275 hitter with 418 hits, two home runs and 167 RBI in 466 games.

Carey missed the 1943–45 baseball seasons while serving in the United States Navy during World War II. In , he returned to the Red Sox, but played only three games before joining the coaching staff of manager Joe Cronin for the balance of the season, during which Boston won the AL pennant. He then worked briefly in the Red Sox' farm system as a coach and manager.

He died in Rochester, New York, at the age of 63.

External links
Baseball Almanac
Baseball Library
Baseball Reference

1906 births
1970 deaths
United States Navy personnel of World War II
Baseball players from New Jersey
Boston Red Sox coaches
Boston Red Sox players
Chambersburg Young Yanks players
Columbus Red Birds players
Houston Buffaloes players
Major League Baseball second basemen
Major League Baseball shortstops
Rochester Red Wings players
St. Louis Browns players
Sportspeople from Hoboken, New Jersey
Military personnel from New Jersey